The 2020 National Premier Leagues Victoria was the seventh season of the National Premier Leagues Victoria, the top league in Victorian football. Bentleigh Greens are the defending champions, having won their third championship title the previous season. The season started on 13 February and was cancelled on 18 March, due to the impacts from the COVID-19 pandemic in Australia.

Teams
Fourteen teams compete in the league – the top twelve teams from the two teams promoted from the NPL Victoria 2. The promoted teams were Eastern Lions from the Eastern conference and St Albans Saints from the Western conference. They replaced Kingston City and Pascoe Vale.

Stadiums and locations

Note: Table lists in alphabetical order.

League table

Results

Season statistics

Scoring

Top scorers

Hat-tricks

References

External links
 Official website

2020 in Australian soccer